The 1979 IIHF European U18 Championship was the twelfth playing of the IIHF European Junior Championships.

Group A 
Played in Tychy and Katowice, Poland from March 31 to April 6, 1979.

First round
Group 1

Group 2

Final round 
Championship round

Placing round

Italy was relegated to Group B for 1980.

Tournament Awards
Top Scorer: Jose Pekkala  (13 Points)
Top Goalie: Paweł Łukaszka
Top Defenceman:Timo Blomqvist
Top Forward: Jan Ludvig

Group B
Played in Miercurea Ciuc, Romania from March 4–8, 1979.

First round
Group 1

Group 2

Placing round 

Norway was promoted to Group A, and Denmark was relegated to Group C, for 1980.

Group C 
Played in Sofia, Bulgaria from March 1–6, 1979.

Bulgaria was promoted to Group B for 1980.

References

Complete results

Junior
IIHF European Junior Championship tournament
International ice hockey competitions hosted by Poland
International ice hockey competitions hosted by Romania
Sports competitions in Katowice
Sport in Tychy
20th century in Katowice
IIHF European U18 Championship
IIHF European U18 Championship
Junior
Junior
Junior
Miercurea Ciuc
1970s in Sofia
Sports competitions in Sofia